Kadhal Solla Aasai is a 2014 Tamil-language romantic drama film directed by K.S. Tamil Seenu. The film stars Ashok, Wasna Ahmed, Madhu Raghuram, and Ravi Raghavendra with Rajendran in a negative role.

Cast 
 Ashok as Mahesh
 Wasna Ahmed as Suchitra
 Madhu Raghuram as Gautam
 Ravi Raghavendra as Ravikanth
 Rajendran as Verumpuli
 M. S. Bhaskar as Anjali's father
 Ravi
 Manimaran
 Suganya
 Daniel
 Siva

Production 
Sound engineer  Thamizh Seenu was encouraged by his friends to participate in the Nalaya Iyakkunar talent show on TV and eventually direct his own film. Sisters S. Rajalakshmi and S. Vijayalakshmi agreed to produce the film after hearing the film's screenplay. Telugu music director M. M. Srilekha agreed to score the music for the film after appealing to the film's story. This is her second Tamil film after Naalaiya Theerpu (1992). Sound engineer Madhu Raghuram makes his acting debut in this film after Thamizh Seenu approached him. His character is one of the main characters that appears in the second half. Noted personalites like T. Siva, G. N. R. Kumaravelan, and Mahendran and cast members M. S. Baskar and Rajendran released the film's trailer.

Soundtrack 
M. M. Srilekha composed six songs for the film. During the audio launch event  in Chennai, the songs were released by Keyaar and received by S. J. Suryah and Vijay Sethupathi. The songs were notably released online directly instead of through a CD.

Release 
The Times of India gave the film two-and-a-half out of five stars and wrote that "Director K S Tamil Seenu has come up with a clean, decent entertainer".

References

External links 

2014 films
2010s Tamil-language films
2014 romantic comedy-drama films
Indian romantic comedy-drama films
2014 directorial debut films
2014 comedy films
2014 drama films